A New Life is the second album by The Marshall Tucker Band. It was recorded in Macon, Georgia at Capricorn Studios. Guest musicians include Charlie Daniels and Jaimoe from The Allman Brothers Band.

Music 

The sound of A New Life is considered to draw more heavily on the band's country influences than their debut, while also incorporating elements of blues and jazz. Also of note, the band uses a mellotron on "You Ain't Foolin' Me".

Track listing
All songs written by Toy Caldwell.

Side one
"A New Life" - 6:44
"Southern Woman" - 7:55
"Blue Ridge Mountain Sky" - 3:37
"Too Stubborn" - 3:58

Side two
"Another Cruel Love" - 3:58
"You Ain't Foolin' Me" - 7:03
"24 Hours at a Time" - 5:04
"Fly Eagle Fly" - 4:25

Shout Factory! 2004 remaster
"Another Cruel Love" (Recorded live at the Performing Arts Center, Milwaukee, WI, July 11, 1974) - 4:23

Personnel
Doug Gray - lead vocals, guitar, percussion
Toy Caldwell - guitar, steel guitar, slide guitar, lead vocals on "Blue Ridge Mountain Sky" and "Fly Eagle Fly"
Tommy Caldwell - bass guitar, background vocals
George McCorkle - guitar, banjo
Paul Riddle - drums
Jerry Eubanks - flute, saxophone, keyboards, background vocals
Paul Hornsby - keyboards
Charlie Daniels - fiddle
Jaimoe - conga, conductor
Earl Ford - horn
Oscar Jackson - horn
Todd Logan - horn
Harold Williams - horn

Production
Producer: Paul Hornsby
Recording engineers: Sam Whiteside, Paul Hornsby
Mastering engineer: George Marino 
Art direction: Wondergraphics, David and Jimmy Holmes
Photography: Unknown
Liner notes: Unknown

References

Marshall Tucker Band albums
Capricorn Records albums
1974 albums
Albums produced by Paul Hornsby